Kharestan may refer to:
 Kharestan, Fars
 Kharestan, Gilan
 Kharestan, Kohgiluyeh and Boyer-Ahmad
 Kharestan-e Bala, Sistan and Baluchestan Province
 Kharestan-e Pain, Sistan and Baluchestan Province
 Kharestan, South Khorasan
 Kharestan-e Olya (disambiguation)
 Kharestan-e Sofla (disambiguation)